Shell Energy Retail Limited is the UK consumer gas, electricity and broadband operations business of Shell.

The company does not generate electricity, instead purchasing it from international markets. Originally known as First Utility, the company had a relationship with Shell, where it acted as an intermediary to purchase wholesale energy on the global market. Shell reached an agreement to purchase the company in December 2017, and completed the acquisition in February 2018. Rebranding to Shell Energy in the UK took place in March 2019 and the business now forms part of Shell's New Energies division.

History

First Utility was launched in 2008 by co-founders Mark Daeche, Darren Braham and Marcus Citron as a spin-out from First Telecom. In January 2012, the company appointed the former lastminute.com CEO Ian McCaig as its new CEO.

As a small new entrant to the market, the company experimented with new technology. The company was the first in the UK to offer smart meters to its residential customers. This also gave the company experience of a large smart meter roll-out programme. The company partnered with various other providers including oPower and Google PowerMeter to provide customers with access to usage data.

Ofgem issued a disciplinary order against the company in December 2010 for failing to protect vulnerable customers.

In 2014, the company received criticism for the tone of its energy saving advice. When it was reported that shadow Energy Minister Tom Greatrex had said the advice was an "insult" to millions of people, the company's reported response was that "These tips are meant to provide some advice on how we might reduce our energy usage and absolutely not intended to trivialise the issue of fuel poverty, something we take very seriously."

In January 2014, the company signed a three-year deal to become title sponsors of the Super League.

In September 2014, the firm announced it was considering an initial public offering or outside investment to fund foreign expansion.

In September 2015, the company announced an expansion into Germany to be branded as Shell.

In September 2015, Reuters reported that First Utility had doubled customer numbers in three of the last four years, adding 275,000 customers in the year to July 2015.

Shell reached an agreement to buy the company in December 2017, and the deal was completed on 28 February 2018. In March 2019, the company announced all customers would be supplied with electricity from 100% renewable sources.

First Utility had also offered an Internet access service, bundled with line rental and phone calls, and this was continued under the Shell Energy brand.

Acquisitions 
In October 2019, Shell Energy agreed the £10.5m purchase of the customers of Green Star Energy, a brand of Canada's Just Energy. Green Star had around 200,000 residential gas and electricity customers.

In February 2021, Shell Energy took over the broadband and phone customers of Post Office Ltd.

In September 2021, Ofgem chose Shell Energy to take on the 255,000 customers of failed supplier Green Supplier Limited. The following month, Ofgem chose Shell Energy to take on the 15,000 Colorado Energy, 235,000 Pure Planet and 9,000 Daligas customers after those suppliers ceased trading.

Finances
In 2020 the company had revenue of £856 million, gross profit of £84 million and a net operating loss of £84 million.

References

External links

Electric power companies of the United Kingdom
Energy companies established in 2008
Utilities of the United Kingdom
Shell plc subsidiaries